Maine School Administrative District 52 (MSAD 52, SAD 52 or RSU 52) is a school district containing the towns of Turner, Greene, and Leeds, Maine.

The school district is composed of the following schools:
Greene Central School
Leeds Central School
Turner Primary School
Turner Elementary School
Tripp Middle School
Leavitt Area High School

References

External links 

52
Education in Androscoggin County, Maine